Johannes Maria Henricus ("Eric" or "Erik") Pierik (born March 21, 1959 in Zwolle) is a former field hockey player from the Netherlands, who was a member of the Dutch National Team that finished sixth in the 1984 Summer Olympics in Los Angeles. Pierik earned a total number of 73 caps, scoring one goal, in the years 1980-1984. After the Los Angeles Games he retired from international competition.

External links
 
 Dutch Hockey Federation

1959 births
Living people
Dutch male field hockey players
Olympic field hockey players of the Netherlands
Field hockey players at the 1984 Summer Olympics
Sportspeople from Zwolle
20th-century Dutch people